Hsenhsua is a genus of flowering plant in the family Orchidaceae. Its only species is Hsenhsua  chrysea, native to Bhutan to South Central China. It is placed in the tribe Orchideae.

The genus was first described in 2014. The species Hsenhsua chrysea was first described, as Habenaria chrysea, by William Wright Smith in 1921.

References

Orchideae
Orchideae genera
Monotypic Orchidoideae genera